Tri-Eastern Conference titles during the spring season.

Baseball TEC Titles

Baseball Sectional Titles

Baseball Regional, Semi-State, State Titles

Boys' TEC Golf Titles

Boys' Sectional Golf Titles

Softball TEC Titles

Softball Sectional Titles

Softball Regional, Semi-State, State Titles

Girls' TEC Tennis Titles

Girls' Sectional Tennis Titles

Girls' Regional, Semi-State, State Tennis Titles

Boys' TEC Track Titles

Boys' Sectional Track Titles

Boys' Individual State Titles

Girls' TEC Track Titles

Girls' Sectional Track Titles

Sources 
T.E.C. Boys Champions
T.E.C. Girls Champions

High school sports conferences and leagues in the United States
Indiana High School Athletic Association